Chasnalla Academy is a senior secondary school located in Chasnalla, Jharkhand, India.

History
Chasnalla Academy was established in Chasnalla on 9 February 1973 by a cross section of people to cater of the quality educational requirements of the children of SAIL-ISP employees as well as other local and tribal population, which they were deprived of until then.

In September 1975, the SAIL-ISP management granted the aided school status of the Academy. In 1983, the Academy could successfully obtain the affiliation from Central Board of Secondary Education in New Delhi. Over the years, the school has added new facilities and during the 2005-2006 academic year, graduated into a Senior Secondary school.

NIIT joint venture
Chasnalla Academy is one of the first few schools to introduce computer subjects in its curriculum from standard 4 onwards in the region.   In 2007, the school signed a joint venture with NIIT to help improve teaching standards and the overall learning environment.

Management
The school is run under the Chasnalla & Jitpur School Executive Committee, which manages both the Chasnalla Academy and a secondary school called the Jitpur Academy.

The management committee is headed by the senior management cadre of SAIL - ISP. Presently, the school runs in two sessions for preparing students for C.B.S.E. 10+2 pattern of examinations.

Footnotes

External links
https://web.archive.org/web/20110707054555/http://cjsec.110mb.com/

Schools in Jharkhand